Paramount Digital Entertainment, Inc. (formerly known as Paramount Interactive) was a subsidiary of Paramount Pictures that developed and distributed movies and video games digitally via various platforms including online, mobile, virtual reality and portable devices.

List of video games

as Paramount Interactive

as Paramount Digital Entertainment

Digital series

References 

Video game companies of the United States
Video game publishers

Entertainment companies established in 1993
Video game companies established in 1993
Video game companies disestablished in 1998
Paramount Pictures
Software companies based in North Carolina
Re-established companies
Entertainment companies established in 2009
Video game companies established in 2009
Paramount Global divisions